
Gmina Goworowo is a rural gmina (administrative district) in Ostrołęka County, Masovian Voivodeship, in east-central Poland.

Villages
Gmina Goworowo contains the villages and settlements of Borki, Brzeźno, Brzeźno-Kolonia, Cisk, Czarnowo, Czernie, Damięty, Daniłowo, Dzbądzek, Gierwaty, Góry, Goworówek, Goworowo, Grabowo, Grodzisk, Jawory-Podmaście, Jawory-Wielkopole, Jemieliste, Józefowo, Jurgi, Kaczka, Kobylin, Kruszewo, Kunin, Lipianka, Ludwinowo, Michałowo, Nogawki, Pasieki, Pokrzywnica, Pokrzywnica-Kolonia, Ponikiew Duża, Ponikiew Mała, Ponikiew Mała-Kolonia, Rębisze-Działy, Rębisze-Kolonia, Rębisze-Parcele, Stare Jawory, Struniawy, Szarłat, Szczawin, Wólka Brzezińska, Wólka Kunińska, Żabin and Zaorze.

Neighbouring gminas
Gmina Goworowo is bordered by the gminas of Czerwin, Długosiodło, Młynarze, Różan, Rzekuń, Rzewnie and Wąsewo.

References

External links
Polish official population figures 2006

Goworowo
Ostrołęka County